Betony is a common name for a plant which may refer to:

Stachys, a genus of plants containing several species commonly known as betony in Europe
Stachys officinalis, a historically important medicinal plant
Pedicularis, a genus of plants containing several species commonly known as betony in North America